Shawville is an unincorporated community in Clearfield County, Pennsylvania, United States. Shawville has a post office, with ZIP code 16873.

There is no independent demographic data available for Shawville.

Notable Site 

 Shawville Generating Station was a 626 megawatt coal-fired power station formerly run by GenOn Energy. In December 2016, the plant was converted to a 590 megawatt natural gas power station. In a 2011 investigation conducted by several environmental groups, including the Environmental Integrity Project (EIP), EarthJustice, and the Sierra Club, Shawville ranked third in the amount of toxic emissions produced per station nationwide.

References

Unincorporated communities in Clearfield County, Pennsylvania
Unincorporated communities in Pennsylvania